The following radio stations broadcast on AM frequency 900 kHz: 900 AM is a Mexican and Canadian clear channel frequency. XEW Mexico City and CKBI Prince Albert, Saskatchewan, share Class A status on 900 kHz.

Argentina
 LT7 in Corrientes
 Radio Municipal in 25 de Mayo

Australia
VL2LT at Lithgow, New South Wales

Barbados
 8PX-AM in Bridgetown

Bolivia (audible in northern Chile)
 CP-128 (900) in Cochabamba
 CP-083 (900) in Montero
 CP-079 (900) in Tarija

Cameroon
 AM 900 in Yaoundé

Canada
Stations in bold are clear-channel stations.

Chile
 W Radio 090 – Santiago.

China
 BEN42 in Datong
 BET8 in Jiamusi
 CNR The Voice of China in Benxi urban area
 CNR Business Radio
 CRI News Radio in Beijing
 Radio Zhuhai Channel 2 in Guangdong

Macau
 XXAA-AM in Macau

Denmark

Greenland
 OYJ in Umanaq

Guatemala (Channel 37)
TGMA in Puerto Barrios

Indonesia
 PM4... in Banyumas
 PM3B... in Cianjur 
 PM2B... in Jakarta 
 PM8C... in Kalianda
 PM8BYN in Kediri 
 PM3C.... in Medan 
 PM5CHA in Padang
 PM2DRO in Sanggau
 PM4... in Sukorejo
 PM2D... in Sumbawa
 PM6CJG in Sungaipenuh
 PM6... in Surabaya
 PM2CRR in Tonjong Lhoknga

Iran
 Radio Quran in Tehran

Italy
 I1MI in Milan / Siziano

Japan
JOHO in Hakodate, Hokkaido (Transmitting station is in the Hokuto.)
JOHF in Yonago, Tottori
 JOZR (RKC Kochi Broadcasting) in Kōchi, Kōchi

Mexico
Stations in bold are clear-channel stations.
 XEW-AM in Mexico City, Distrito Federal – 100 kW, transmitter located at

New Zealand
 ZL4YC in Otago / Highcliff, Shiel Hill

Papua New Guinea
 P2GR in Goroka

Philippines
 DXRZ in Zamboanga

Russian Federation
 RW61 in Sovetskiy

Spain
 EAK13 in Bilbao
 EAK57 in Cáceres
 EAK39 in Granada
 EAK33 in Vigo

United States

References

Lists of radio stations by frequency